Live 1966: The "Royal Albert Hall" Concert is a two-disc live album by Bob Dylan, released in 1998. It is the second installment in the ongoing Bob Dylan Bootleg Series on Legacy Recordings, and has been certified a gold record by the RIAA. It was recorded at the Manchester Free Trade Hall during Dylan's 1966 world tour, though early bootlegs attributed the recording to the Royal Albert Hall so it became known as the Royal Albert Hall Concert. Extensively bootlegged for decades, it is an important document in the development of popular music during the 1960s.

The set list consisted of two parts, with the first half of the concert being Dylan alone on stage performing an entirely acoustic set of songs, while the second half of the concert has Dylan playing an "electric" set of songs alongside his band the Hawks. The first half of the concert was greeted warmly by the audience, while the second half was highly criticized, with heckling going on before and after each song.

History 

After touring North America from the fall of 1965 through the winter of 1966, Dylan, accompanied by the Hawks (later renamed the Band), embarked on a six-week spring tour that began in Australia, wound through western Europe, Ireland and the United Kingdom, and wrapped up in London.  Dylan's move to electric music, and his apparent disconnection from traditional folk music, continued to be controversial, and his UK audiences were particularly disruptive with some fans believing Dylan had "sold out".

The electric part of this concert first surfaced in late 1970 or early 1971 on bootleg LPs with various titles. On June 3, 1971, critic Dave Marsh reviewed one bootleg in Creem magazine, writing "It is the most supremely elegant piece of rock 'n' roll music I've ever heard...The extreme subtlety of the music is so closely interwoven with its majesty that they appear as one and the same."
		
The same month, critic Jon Landau reviewed another edition of the concert:

The early bootleg LPs attributed the recording to one of Dylan's tour-closing concerts at London's Royal Albert Hall that was also recorded, as was a show in Liverpool (May 14), supervised by Dylan producer Bob Johnston. However, Dylan's now-legendary confrontation with a heckler calling out "Judas" from the audience, clearly heard on the recording, was well documented as having occurred at Manchester's Free Trade Hall on May 17, 1966. After "Judas!", there is clapping, followed by more heckles. Dylan then says "I don't believe you", then after a pause, "You're a liar." Bob Dylan then said to his band, "play it fuckin' loud" as they begin "Like a Rolling Stone." At the end, the audience erupts into applause and Dylan says, "Thank you."

After years of conflicting reports and speculation among Dylan discographers, the Manchester source was verified after the preliminary mix of a proposed Columbia edition was bootlegged in 1995 as Guitars Kissing & The Contemporary Fix. Dylan rejected that edition; three years later, he authorized a markedly different version for his second "Bootleg Series" release. One song recorded at Dylan's real Royal Albert Hall concert had been previously released: his May 26, 1966, performance of "Visions of Johanna" on the Box set Biograph. Excerpts from other 1966 UK performances are included in Martin Scorsese's 2005 television documentary No Direction Home. Film footage of the "Judas" incident was discovered and used at the end of the documentary.
		
The inside leaflet reveals useful information about the conditions of how the concert was recorded and transferred to disc and it confirms that the version of "It's All Over Now, Baby Blue", previously released on the Box set Biograph, duly comes from this concert.
		
On July 29, 1966, two months after finishing his spring tour, Dylan suffered a motorcycle accident. As a result of his long recuperation, Dylan had to cancel the remaining shows he had scheduled for 1966. However, he would continue to collaborate with the Hawks, and over the next year or so, they would produce some of their most celebrated recordings, many of which were eventually released on The Basement Tapes. Dylan would not embark on another tour until 1974.

Reception and legacy

Finally released in 1998, Live 1966: The "Royal Albert Hall" Concert was a commercial and critical success. It reached #19 in the U.K. and was included in the book 1001 Albums You Must Hear Before You Die.

"For (Led Zeppelin guitarist) Jimmy Page," remarked photographer (and Page's friend) Ross Halfin, "this (the bootleg) is still the ultimate album. Jimmy still buys copies of it whenever he sees it, as he likes it so much."

The album is ranked number 989 in All Time Top 1000 Albums (3rd. edition, 2000). Elvis Costello named it as one of his 500 favorite albums.

Track listing 
All songs written by Bob Dylan except "Baby, Let Me Follow You Down" by Eric von Schmidt and arranged by Dylan.

Personnel 
 Bob Dylan – vocal, acoustic guitar, electric guitar, harmonica; piano on "Ballad of a Thin Man"
 Robbie Robertson – electric guitar
 Garth Hudson – organ
 Richard Manuel – piano
 Rick Danko – bass guitar, backing vocal
 Mickey Jones – drums

Technical personnel
 Jeff Rosen – producer
 Vic Anesini – engineering
 Steven Berkowitz, Michael Brauer – mixing
 Greg Calbi – mastering
 Geoff Gans – art direction
 Mark Wilder – editing
 Tony Glover – liner notes

Photography
 Barry Feinstein, David Gahr
 Don Hunstein, Art Kane
 Mark Makin, Hank Parker
 Jan Persson, Jerry Schatzberg
 Sandy Speiser

See also 
 Bob Dylan World Tour 1966
 Eat the Document

References

External links 
 Bootleg reviews

1998 live albums
Bob Dylan compilation albums
Bob Dylan live albums
Columbia Records live albums
The Band live albums